Sabine River and Northern Railroad  operates freight service  from Bessmay to Echo, Texas, and over an  branch line from Buna to Evadale. SRN has connections with Union Pacific Railroad at Echo and Mauriceville, with Kansas City Southern Railway at Lemonville, and with a BNSF Railway shortline (Timber Rock Railroad at Bessmay and Evadale, TX). Traffic consists of pulp and paper products.

History
The company was incorporated April 20, 1965, and construction was completed and service start from Echo to Mulford in April 1966. Service was extended to Mauriceville and Bessmay in August 1967. The branch to Evadale was in operation in June 1988.

References

Texas railroads
Railway companies established in 1965